A penumbral lunar eclipse will take place on Friday, May 5, 2023, the first of two lunar eclipses in 2023. The moon's apparent diameter will be only 0.1% larger than average because it occurs 5.5 days before perigee (Perigee on May 11, 2023). This will be the deepest penumbral eclipse since February 2017 and until September 2042.

Visibility 
It will be completely visible over Asia and Australia, and will be seen rising over Africa and much of Europe (basically in Eastern and Central Europe).

Member 
This is the 24th member of Lunar Saros 141. The previous event was the April 2005 lunar eclipse. The next event is the May 2041 lunar eclipse.

Related eclipses

Eclipses of 2023 
 A hybrid solar eclipse on 20 April.
 A penumbral lunar eclipse on 5 May.
 An annular solar eclipse on 14 October.
 A partial lunar eclipse on 28 October.

Lunar year series

Saros series

Metonic series 

This eclipse is the last of four Metonic cycle lunar eclipses on the same date, 4–5 May, each separated by 19 years:

Tritos series 
 Preceded: Lunar eclipse of June 4, 2012

 Followed: Lunar eclipse of April 3, 2034

Tzolkinex 
 Preceded: Lunar eclipse of March 23, 2016

 Followed: Lunar eclipse of June 15, 2030

Half-Saros cycle
A lunar eclipse will be preceded and followed by solar eclipses by 9 years and 5.5 days (a half saros). This lunar eclipse is related to two annular solar eclipses of Solar Saros 148.

See also 
List of lunar eclipses and List of 21st-century lunar eclipses

References

External links 
 cycle 141
 

2023-05
2023-05
2023 in science